Ruth Page is the name of:
 Ruth Page (ballerina) (1899–1991), American ballerina and choreographer
 Ruth Page (activist) (1905–1992), political activist
 Ruth Page (theologian) (1935–2015), theologian and first female principal of New College, Edinburgh